The 1939 Georgetown Hoyas football team was an American football team that represented Georgetown University as an independent during the 1939 college football season. In their eighth season under head coach Jack Hagerty, the Hoyas compiled a 7–0–1 record, shut out five of eight opponents, and outscored all opponents by a total of 109 to 22. The team was ranked No. 16 in the AP Poll of November 20 but dropped out of the final poll. 

The team played its home games at Griffith Stadium in Washington, D.C.

Schedule

References

Georgetown
Georgetown Hoyas football seasons
College football undefeated seasons
Georgetown Hoyas football